Duptaraup Union  is a Union of Araihazar Upazila in the District and Division of Dhaka, Bangladesh.

References

External links
 Official website  

Unions of Araihazar Upazila
Populated places in Dhaka Division
Populated places in Narayanganj District